EWG may refer to:

 Eastern Washington Gateway Railroad, an American railroad
 East-West Gateway Council of Governments, a planning organization in Greater St. Louis, United States
 Election Working Group, a Bangladeshi civic organization
 Electron withdrawing group
 Energy Watch Group, an international energy think tank
 Environmental Working Group, an American environmental organization
 Eurogroup Working Group, an advisory body to the Eurogroup of the European Union
 Eurowings, a German airline